Fannin County Comprehensive High School is a public high school located in Blue Ridge, Georgia, United States.

Fannin High offers a large array of classes, including seven Advanced Placement classes: English literature, English language, biology, calculus, studio art, art history, European history, US history, and statistics.

Fannin High is a member of the GHSA 3A athletic class for over 10 sports.

References

External links
Fannin County High School
Fannin County School System

Schools in Fannin County, Georgia
Public high schools in Georgia (U.S. state)